John Basil Meeking (19 November 1929 – 11 June 2020) was the 7th bishop of Christchurch, New Zealand from 1987 to 1995.

Career
Having been ordained as a priest in 1953, he was appointed as Bishop of Christchurch by Pope John Paul II on 30 March 1987 and resigned the see on 15 December 1995. During this time, among other apostolic works, he served as the chaplain to Christchurch Hospital and represented the Catholic Church at the National Council of Churches.

From 1963 to 1966, he studied at the Pontifical University of Saint Thomas Aquinas in Rome, following which he was appointed to the Pontifical Council for Promoting Christian Unity in Rome, where he served for eighteen years.

Bishop Meeking died in Christchurch on 11 June 2020, aged 90, after what was reported as a "recent period of ill-health".

Notes

External links
 Catholic Hierarchy website, "Bishop John Basil Meeking" (retrieved 28 January 2011).

1929 births
2020 deaths
People educated at St Bede's College, Christchurch
Holy Cross College, New Zealand alumni
20th-century Roman Catholic bishops in New Zealand
People from Ashburton, New Zealand
Roman Catholic bishops of Christchurch